Kaali is a 1980 Indian action film written by Mahendran and directed by I. V. Sasi. Produced by Hem-Nag, the film stars Rajinikanth, Seema, Fatafat Jayalaxmi and Shubha. The film was simultaneously made in Tamil and Telugu languages, with Chiranjeevi replacing Vijayakumar in Telugu. The cinematography was handled by Ashok Kumar and soundtrack was composed by Ilaiyaraaja. Kaali ran for less than 50 days in Chennai and was considered a box office failure in both Tamil and Telugu.

Plot

Cast 
Rajinikanth as Kaali
Vijayakumar (Tamil) / Chiranjeevi (Telugu) as G.K.
Seema as Anitha/Geetha
Fatafat Jayalaxmi as Alangaram
Major Sundarrajan (Tamil) / Kantha Rao (Telugu) as Sampath
Manorama as Thayamma
Suruli Rajan as Sokku
Shubha as Sampath's wife
Vennira Aadai Nirmala as Rajinikanth's sister
V. Gopalakrishnan (Tamil) / Giri Babu (Telugu) as Somu
Kaikala Satyanarayana as Rajaram
Prasad Babu as Rajram's one the son
Sundar Raj as Rajram's one the son
Pushpalatha  as Rajram's Wife
Anuradha Sriram as child artist
Master Haja Sheriff as child artist
Kumarimuthu

Soundtrack 
The music was composed by Ilaiyaraaja. The film had Vairamuthu's first written song, "Kali Bhadrakali".

References

Bibliography

External links 
 

1980 films
1980 multilingual films
1980s Tamil-language films
1980s Telugu-language films
Films directed by I. V. Sasi
Films scored by Ilaiyaraaja
Films with screenplays by Mahendran (filmmaker)
Indian multilingual films